Capsus is a genus of mirid bugs belonging to the family Miridae, subfamily Mirinae.

Species
Current and extinct species: (Dagger, indicates extinct.)
 Capsus annulicornis	Herrich-Schaeffer, 1835    
 Capsus ater (Linnaeus, 1758) 
 Capsus aurulentus	(Schilling, 1837)
 Capsus capitatus	Herrich-Schaeffer, 1835
 Capsus ceratophyllon	Costa, O., 1834
 Capsus cinctus	(Kolenati, 1845)
 Capsus coxalis	Mulsant and Rey, 1852
 Capsus darsius	Distant, 1904
 Capsus gibbicollis	Herrich-Schaeffer, 1835
 Capsus intaminatus	Walker, 1873
 Capsus lacus S. Scudder, 1890
 Capsus marginicollis	Walker, 1873
 Capsus obsolefactus S. Scudder, 1890
 Capsus pallescens	Herrich-Schaeffer, 1835
 Capsus palustris	Kulik, 1977
 Capsus pegasus	Distant, 1904
 Capsus peregrinus	Herrich-Schaeffer, 1835
 Capsus pilifer	Remane, 1950
 Capsus punctipes	Mulsant and Rey, 1852
 Capsus semiclusus	Walker, 1873
 Capsus subirroratus	Walker, 1873
 Capsus tristis	Scholtz, 1847
 Capsus wagneri	Remane, 1950
 Capsus waltlii	Herrich-Schaeffer, 1835

Species formerly classified as Caspus
 Capsus affinis reclassified as Calocoris affinis (Herrich-Schaeffer, 1835)
 Capsus ambulans reclassified as Mecomma ambulans (Fallén, 1807)
 Capsus antennatus reclassified as Teratocoris antennatus (Boheman, 1852)
 Capsus bicolor reclassified as Platytylus bicolor (Lepeletier and Serville, 1825)
 Capsus brevicollis Meyer-Dur, 1843 junior synonym of Adelphocoris lineolatus (Goeze, 1778)
 Capsus caligineus reclassified as Cyrtocapsus caligineus (Stål, 1859)
 Capsus caricis reclassified as Cyrtorhinus caricis (Fallén, 1807)
 Capsus coccineus reclassified as Pseudoloxops coccineus (Meyer-Dür, 1843)
 Capsus cyrtopeltis reclassified as Stethoconus cyrtopeltis (Flor, 1860)
 Capsus darwini reclassified as Dagbertus darwini (Butler, 1877)
 Capsus elegantulus Meyer-Dür, 1843 junior synonym of Cyrtorhinus caricis (Fallén, 1807)
 Capsus exsanguis reclassified as Megalocoleus exsanguis (Herrich-Schaeffer, 1835)
 Capsus flavipes reclassified as Plagiognathus flavipes (Provancher, 1872)
 Capsus geminus Flor, 1860 synonym for Tytthus pubescens (Knight, 1931)
 Capsus lineolatus reclassified as Adelphocoris lineolatus (Goeze, 1778)
 Capsus maerkelii reclassified as Pithanus maerkelii (Herrich-Schäffer, 1838)
 Capsus magnicornis reclassified as Atractotomus magnicornis (Fallén, 1807)
 Capsus media reclassified as Lopidea media (Say, 1832)
 Capsus mimus reclassified as Dysdercus mimus (Say, 1932)
 Capsus modestus reclassified as Phoenicocoris modestus (Meyer-Dür, 1843)
 Capsus nubilus Herrich-Schaeffer, 1836 synonym for Macrolophus pygmaeus (Rambur, 1839)
 Capsus nubilus Say, 1832 reclassified as Neurocolpus nubilus (Say, 1832)
 Capsus pallidus reclassified as Dicyphus pallidus (Herrich-Schaeffer, 1836)
 Capsus roseus reclassified as Conostethus roseus (Fallén, 1829)
 Capsus rotermundi reclassified as Sthenarus rotermundi (Scholtz, 1847)
 Capsus rutilus Stichel, 1930 junior synonym for Capsus ater (Linnaeus, 1758) 
 Capsus solani reclassified as Irbisia solani (Heidemann, 1910)
 Capsus stygicus reclassified as Slaterocoris stygicus (Say, 1832)
 Capsus tenuicornis reclassified as Cylapus tenuicornis (Say, 1832)
 Capsus tumidicornis reclassified as Heterocordylus tumidicornis (Herrich-Schaeffer, 1835)
 Capsus tyrannus (Fabricius, 1781) junior synonym for Capsus ater (Linnaeus, 1758) 
 Capsus vitellinus reclassified as Parapsallus vitellinus (Scholtz, 1847)
 Capsus vitripennis reclassified as Hyaliodes vitripennis (Say, 1832)

References

Miridae genera
Mirini